The Acclaimed are an American professional wrestling tag team, consisting of Max Caster and Anthony Bowens, signed to All Elite Wrestling. They are former AEW World Tag Team Champions.

History

All Elite Wrestling (2020-present)
Caster and Bowens were initially performed individually on AEW programming in 2020. Caster first appeared on AEW Dark as a solo act, with Bowens being brought in a month later. The idea of putting the two together as a tag team was conceived by Tony Khan, who also named them the Acclaimed. Their debut match as a team was against Best Friends; according to Bowens, Khan offered them full-time contracts immediately after the match, on a 5-year deal. On the Holiday Bash special, the Acclaimed challenged the Young Bucks for the AEW World Tag Team Championship, but were unsuccessful. Bowens has expressed that initially fan reaction to the team was more negative than expected, which led to him ironically declaring "everyone loves the Acclaimed" in promos.

The Acclaimed competed in a  Battle Royal to determine the number 1 contenders for the tag team titles on February 3, 2021, but lost to Chris Jericho and MJF of The Inner Circle. On April 22, 2021 they again competed in a #1 contendership match, this time a four way, where they were defeated by SCU.

On the August 3, 2021 episode of Dark, while making his entrance, Caster rapped about subjects such as Olympic gymnast Simone Biles' mental health issues, the Duke lacrosse case, the validity of PCR COVID-19 testing, and made a sexual joke about Julia Hart. Caster was suspended for two months without pay for the incident, effectively putting the team on hiatus. AEW owner Tony Khan called the rap "terrible", said it should have been edited out of the show and announced that he would personally be taking over the editing of the show going forward.  He returned to action at Dark: Elevation on September 1. After Caster returned from suspension, the Acclaimed challenged reigning champions the Lucha Brothers for the tag team titles on the June 10, 2021 episode of Rampage, but were unsuccessful.

Beginning in 2022, the Acclaimed would ally with the Gunn Club, Billy Gunn his sons Austin and Colton. On Dark and Dark: Elevation, the alliance would defeat the Dark Order and later the team of Lee Johnson, Brock Anderson, Lee Moriarty, and Matt Sydal. Although ostentisiably allies, the Acclaimed would regularly disparage Austin and Colton, with Billy Gunn showing unequal favour towards the Caster and Bowens. The Acclaimed competed in a #1 contendership tag battle royal on March 3, 2022, although lost to the Young Bucks. They later challenged Jurassic Express for the tag titles, but were unsuccessful. In May 2022, Bowens underwent knee surgery, sidelining him for several months. During this time Bowens still attended AEW shows and performed his regular promos, although did not wrestle and was confined to a wheelchair; Caster would subsequently team increasingly with the Gunns. Bowens returned from injury at the Blood and Guts edition of Dynamite.

Their alliance with the Gunns broke down and turned into a rivalry in mid-2022, leading to a "Dumpster Match" in August 2022, which the Acclaimed won. While Billy Gunn was initially caught between the two groups, he would be turned on by his sons who had joined the Firm, leading to him becoming the Acclaimed's manager.

Tag team champions
In the latter half of 2022, the Acclaimed would enter a feud with tag team champions Swerve in our Glory (Swerve Strickland and Keith Lee). At All Out of that year the Acclaimed challenged for tag team championships, although Strickland and Lee retained. The Acclaimed again challenged for the titles on the September 21 episode of Dynamite, winning the bout and becoming AEW World Tag Team champions for the first time. Over the following months the team would successfully defend the titles against  Private Party and The Butcher and The Blade in a triple-threat match, the Varsity Athletes (Tony Nese and Josh Woods), and a rematch against Swerve in Our Glory at November's Full Gear.

In early 2023, the Acclaimed resumed their feud with Austin and Colton Gunn. On the February 8, 2023 episode of Dynamite, the Gunns successfully beat the Acclaimed for the tag team champions, ending their reign at 140 days.

Championships and accomplishments
All Elite Wrestling
 AEW World Tag Team Championship (1 time)
Pro Wrestling Illustrated
Ranked No. 304 of the top 500 singles wrestlers in the PWI 500 in 2021 (Bowens)
Ranked No. 295 of the top 500 singles wrestlers in the PWI 500 in 2021 (Caster)

References

External links 
 Acclaimed Profile at Cagematch.net

All Elite Wrestling personnel
All Elite Wrestling teams and stables